Ice Cream for Crow is the twelfth studio album by Captain Beefheart and the Magic Band, released in September 1982.  It is the last Don Van Vliet recorded before abruptly retiring from music to devote himself to a career as a painter. It spent two weeks in the UK album charts, reaching number 90, but failed to make the Billboard Top 200.

Production 

While Ice Cream for Crow was being produced, Herb Cohen had settled his lawsuit with Frank Zappa over the latter withholding the master tapes to Captain Beefheart's unreleased Bat Chain Puller album. As a cost-saving measure, Don Van Vliet proposed that 3 recordings from Bat Chain Puller - "Human Totem Pole", "Odd Jobs", and "81 Poop Hatch" - be included on Ice Cream for Crow. Zappa ultimately refused this request, and Vliet was left to rework an outtake version of Human Totem Pole, and hastily compose "Skeleton Makes Good" in one evening (although the acappella "81 Poop Hatch" was in fact included from Vliet's own copy of the Bat Chain Puller tape). The songs "Ice Cream For Crow", "Semi-Multicolored Caucasian", "The Past Sure Is Tense" and "The Witch Doctor Life" had also been written for earlier albums but not used.

According to Vliet's biographer Mike Barnes, "the most original and vital tracks [on the album] are the newer ones." Thus, Ice Cream for Crow, while rooted in past musical ideas, points toward a new musical direction for Captain Beefheart and the Magic Band. Indeed, Barnes writes that the album "feels like an hors-d'oeuvre for a main course that never came".

Release and promotion 

The album cover features a painting by Van Vliet and a portrait photo of him by Anton Corbijn. A music video was made to promote the title track, directed by Van Vliet and Ken Schreiber, with cinematography by Daniel Pearl, which was rejected by MTV for being "too weird". However, the video was included in the Letterman broadcast on NBC-TV, and was accepted into the Museum of Modern Art, where it has been used in several of their programs related to music. Van Vliet explained in a 1982 interview on Late Night with David Letterman that the album's title represented the contrast between the black of a crow and the white of vanilla ice cream.

Reception

Disc jockey John Peel, in his narration to the BBC documentary The Artist Formerly Known as Captain Beefheart, called Ice Cream for Crow one of Captain Beefheart's best albums.

Ned Raggett of AllMusic called the album "a last entertaining blast of wigginess from one of the few truly independent artists in late 20th century pop music, with humor, skill, and style all still intact", with the Magic Band "turning out more choppy rhythms, unexpected guitar lines, and outré arrangements, Captain Beefheart lets everything run wild as always, with successful results". Raggett says that Beefheart's "entertainingly outrageous" spoken word performances are successfully cohered with the Magic Band's "insanely great arrangement". Robert Christgau gave the album an A−, saying, "Ornette or no Ornette, the Captain's sprung delta atonality still provides surprising and irreducible satisfactions, but his poetry repeats itself more than his ideas warrant. Any surrealist ecologist who preaches the same sermon every time out is sure to provoke hostile questions from us concrete-jungle types".

Track listing

Personnel 
Captain Beefheart (Don Van Vliet) – vocals, harmonica, soprano sax, Chinese gongs, prop horn
Jeff Moris Tepper – steel appendage guitar, slide guitar, acoustic guitar
Richard "Midnight Hatsize" Snyder – bass guitar, marimba, viola
Gary Lucas – glass-finger guitar, slide guitar, guitar, National steel duolian
Cliff R. Martinez – drums, shake bouquet, glass washboard, metal drums

Additional personnel
Eric Drew Feldman – Rhodes piano, synthesized bass
Janet Van Vliet and Jeff Moris Tepper – production assistance
Don Van Vliet – arranger and producer
Phil Brown – engineer and mastering

(The descriptions "steel-appendage guitar" and "glass-finger guitar" were Beefheartian coinages for slide guitar, respectively using a metal tube or a glass "bottleneck" on the fret finger. Similarly, "shake bouquet" is his name for the maracas.)

Notes

Captain Beefheart albums
1982 albums
Virgin Records albums